The 2002–03 Georgian Cup (also known as the David Kipiani Cup) was the fifty-ninth season overall and thirteenth since independence of the Georgian annual football tournament.

Round of 32 
The first legs were played on 24 and 26 February and the second legs were played on 28 February and 1 March 2003.

|}

Round of 16 
The first legs were played on 5 and 6 March and the second legs were played on 9 and March 2003.

|}

Quarterfinals 
The matches were played on 18 March (first legs) and 10 April 2003 (second legs).

|}

Semifinals 
The matches were played on 19 April (first legs) and 7 May 2003 (second legs).

|}

Final

See also 
 2002–03 Umaglesi Liga

References

External links 
 The Rec.Sport.Soccer Statistics Foundation.

Georgian Cup seasons
Cup
Georgian Cup, 2002-03